Elizabeth Street is the major street which runs southeast to northwest through the city and suburbs of Hobart, Tasmania, Australia.  It was named by the Governor of New South Wales from 1810 to 1821, Lachlan Macquarie, after his wife Elizabeth Macquarie.
It starts at Sullivans Cove and runs northwesterly through the CBD of Hobart and the North Hobart shopping district including the State Cinema, and changes to become New Town Road at the intersection with Augusta Road in New Town.

The Elizabeth Street Pier extends into Sullivan's Cove (the Port of Hobart) from Franklin Wharf near the intersection with Elizabeth Street.  Along the street are the General Post Office, the Hobart Bus Mall, the Elizabeth Street Mall, and Elizabeth College.  Many major banks, insurance companies and retail outlets are situated on or close to Elizabeth Street.

Intersections

Elizabeth Street intersects with the following major streets (from south-east to north-west):

See also

References

Streets in Hobart
North Hobart, Tasmania